H. militaris  may refer to:
 Haematoderus militaris, the crimson fruitcrow, a bird species found in Brazil, French Guiana, Guyana, Suriname and Venezuela
 Hindsiclava militaris, a sea snail species

Synonyms
 Habenaria militaris, a synonym for Habenaria rhodocheila, an orchid species found from South China to peninsular Malaysia and the Philippines
 Hibiscus militaris, a synonym for Hibiscus laevis, the halberd-leaf rosemallow, a herbaceous perennial flower species native to central and eastern North America

See also
 Militaris (disambiguation)